American rock band Thirty Seconds to Mars has recorded material for five studio albums. The band was formed in Los Angeles, California, in 1998 by brothers Jared and Shannon Leto. The duo later expanded to a four-piece when they added guitarist Solon Bixler and bassist Matt Wachter to the line-up. After signing a contract with record label Immortal Records in 1998, the band began to work with producers Bob Ezrin and Brian Virtue on their debut album, 30 Seconds to Mars, which was released in August 2002. The album produced two singles, "Capricorn (A Brand New Name)" and "Edge of the Earth". In early 2003, Bixler left the band due to issues primarily related to touring and was replaced by Tomo Miličević. Thirty Seconds to Mars released their second studio album, A Beautiful Lie, in August 2005. The record, produced by Josh Abraham, was preceded by the single "Attack" and spawned two Kerrang! Award-winning singles, "The Kill" and "From Yesterday". The album's title track, "A Beautiful Lie", was released as the fourth single in selected territories. "Hunter", a song originally performed by Björk, was covered by the band and added to the track listing of the album. In March 2007, Wachter left the group to spend more time with his family and was replaced by Tim Kelleher, performing live only.

Thirty Seconds to Mars returned to the studio in August 2008 to begin work on their third album This Is War (2009), with Flood and Steve Lillywhite producing. "Kings and Queens", the album's lead single, was written by Jared Leto across the United States and South Africa. "This Is War" became the band's third number one single on the US Alternative Songs. "Closer to the Edge" was released as the album's third single. Thirty Seconds to Mars collaborated with rapper Kanye West on the song "Hurricane", which was released on the deluxe edition of This Is War and became the album's fourth single in some territories. Drummer Shannon Leto wrote the instrumental track "L490" and played every instrument on it, including all guitars and a singing bowl. This Is War moved away from the band's typical sound to experiment with different musical genres; a trend which became much more pronounced on the 2013 album Love, Lust, Faith and Dreams, produced by Jared Leto with previous collaborator Steve Lillywhite. The first single released from the album was "Up in the Air", which was followed by "Do or Die" and "City of Angels".

Songs

Footnotes

References

External links
 

 
Thiry Seconds to Mars